Neil Martin (born 27 May 1955) is an Australian former swimmer. He competed in four events at the 1972 Summer Olympics.

References

External links
 

1955 births
Living people
Australian male backstroke swimmers
Australian male medley swimmers
Olympic swimmers of Australia
Swimmers at the 1972 Summer Olympics
Swimmers from Brisbane
20th-century Australian people